This is the discography for American power metal band Kamelot.

Albums

Studio albums

Compilation albums

Live albums

Video albums

Singles
"Ghost Opera" (2007)
"The Great Pandemonium" (2010)
"Sacrimony (Angel of Afterlife)" (2012)
"My Confession" (2013)
"Falling Like the Fahrenheit" (2013)
"Veil of Elysium" (2015)
"Insomnia" (2015)
"RavenLight" (2018)
"Phantom Divine (Shadow Empire)" (2018)
"One More Flag in the Ground" (2023)
"Opus of the Night (Ghost Requiem)" (2023)
"Eventide" (2023)

Music videos

References

Discographies of American artists
Heavy metal group discographies